Harold Ray Ragsdale (born January 24, 1939), known professionally as Ray Stevens, is an American country and pop singer-songwriter and comedian, known for his Grammy-winning recordings "Everything Is Beautiful" and "Misty", as well as novelty hits such as "Gitarzan" and "The Streak". Stevens has received gold albums for his music sales and has worked as a producer, music arranger, and television host. He is also an inductee of the Nashville Songwriters Hall of Fame, the Georgia Music Hall of Fame, the Christian Music Hall of Fame, and the Country Music Hall of Fame and Museum.

Early life
Harold Ray Ragsdale was born on January 24, 1939, in Clarkdale, Georgia. He is the elder of two sons born to Willis Harold Ragsdale (1915–2001) and Frances Stephens Ragsdale (1916–97). Stevens has a younger brother, John, who was an actor and writer. John died in 2020 at the age of 75. While attending high school, Stevens formed his first band, a rhythm and blues group named The Barons. Following his graduation, Stevens enrolled in Georgia State University as a music major.

Career

Early career
At age 18, Stevens signed to Capitol Records' Prep Records division in 1957, and produced the single "Silver Bracelet", with a cover of "Rang Tang Ding Dong" as the B-side. The single was met with a positive review from Billboard. The B-side was originally recorded by doo-wop group The Cellos in 1956.

Stevens signed with Mercury Records in 1961.

1970s
In the 1970s, Stevens became a producer and studio musician in Nashville. He recorded songs for Barnaby Records and Warner Brothers during 1970–79. Stevens' biggest hit in the U.S. was his gospel-inflected single "Everything Is Beautiful" (1970). The single won a Grammy Award, was the theme song for his summer 1970 TV show, hit number one on both the pop and Adult-Contemporary charts, and marked his first time in the Top 40 on the country charts, peaking at number 39. It sold over one million copies and was awarded a gold disc.

Stevens had a transatlantic chart-topping hit in 1974 with "The Streak," a novelty song about streaking that reached number one on the American and British singles charts.

Through the late 1970s and early 1980s, with some exceptions (such as "Shriner's Convention" in 1981), Stevens focused mostly on serious material, as he felt that the novelty song was becoming less popular in the era. Stevens had an adult contemporary crossover hit in 1979 with "I Need Your Help Barry Manilow," a cut from Stevens's Barry Manilow tribute/parody album The Feeling's Not Right Again.

1980s
Stevens then joined MCA in 1984. Feeling that novelty songs were becoming popular again, he authorized the rush release of "Mississippi Squirrel Revival" in 1984, which reached the country top 20. In 1985 he performed at the Lanierland Music Park in Georgia with Pinkard & Bowden.

21st century

In February 2002, following the September 11 attacks, Stevens released Osama—Yo' Mama: The Album after the title track, which was released as a single in late 2001, peaked at #48 on the Hot Country Songs chart in 2001. The album reached #29 on the US Top Country Albums chart.

In April 2010, Stevens released We the People, a CD/DVD of political songs.  This album reached Top-5 on the Billboard Comedy Album chart.

RAY-ality TV ended its digital TV run in January 2014. In March 2014, a webisode series, also titled Rayality TV was launched. In 2014, Stevens co-starred in the movie Campin' Buddies.

Stevens published his autobiographical memoir Ray Stevens' Nashville in 2014.

In 2015, Stevens began producing and hosting “Ray Stevens Nashville”, a 30-minute weekly music variety show on cable TV. Since then, the show has been rebranded as “Ray Stevens CabaRay Nashville” and is now filmed on stage at the brand new CabaRay Showroom, which opened to the public in early 2018. The show currently airs on PBS public television stations around the country.

Stevens released the album Here We Go Again on March 24, 2015, which includes the Taylor Swift spoof single "Taylor Swift is Stalking Me" and "Come to the USA".

Personal life
Stevens was married to Penny Jackson Ragsdale for over 60 years, until her death on December 31, 2021, from a lengthy battle with cancer. Two days prior, he had canceled his New Year's Eve concert at CabaRay, due to Penny's rapidly declining health. They had two daughters, Suzi and Timi, and four grandchildren.

Discography

Accolades

Grammy awards

References

External links
 
 
 Tom Redmond – Working with Chet Atkins: An Interview with Ray Stevens
 Ray Stevens – MyBestYears.COM INTERVIEW SPOTLIGHT
 Ray Stevens Interview NAMM Oral History Library (2014)

1939 births
20th-century American comedians
20th-century American male musicians
20th-century American pianists
21st-century American male musicians
21st-century American pianists
American comedy musicians
American country keyboardists
American country pianists
American country singer-songwriters
American male pianists
American male singer-songwriters
American novelty song performers
CBS Records artists
Country Music Hall of Fame inductees
country musicians from Georgia (U.S. state)
Curb Records artists
Georgia State University alumni
Grammy Award winners
living people
MCA Records artists
Mercury Records artists
Monument Records artists
National Recording Corporation artists
people from Cobb County, Georgia
RCA Records artists
singer-songwriters from Georgia (U.S. state)
Warner Records artists